The tribe Podalyrieae is one of the subdivisions of the plant family Fabaceae.

Description
The Podalyrieae arose 30.5 ± 2.6 million years ago (in the Oligocene) in the fynbos (Cape Floristic Region) of South Africa and is still mostly found there. All members of the tribe exhibit either nonsprouting or sprouting fire survival strategies. Many species are pollinated by insects, especially carpenter bees, while others are pollinated by sunbirds or rodents.

The members of this tribe consistently form a monophyletic clade in molecular phylogenetic analyses. The tribe does not currently have a node-based definition, but several morphological synapomorphies have been identified:

"imparipinnately compound leaves, axillary racemose inflorescences, carboxylic acid esters of quinolizidine alkaloids, and the isoflavone 3′-hydroxydaidzein as a major seed flavonoid" as well as "strongly reduced or absent bracteoles and the occurrence of persistent antipodals in the female gametophyte."

Subtribes and genera

Subtribe Xiphothecinae
 Amphithalea Eckl. & Zeyh.

 Xiphotheca Eckl. & Zeyh.

Subtribe Podalyriinae
 Calpurnia E. Mey.
 Liparia L.
 Podalyria Willd.

 Stirtonanthus B.-E. van Wyk & A. L. Schutte

 Virgilia Poir.

Unassigned
 Cadia Forssk.
 Cyclopia Vent.

References

 
Fabaceae tribes